The maritime European exploration of Australia consisted of several waves of European seafarers who sailed the edges of the Australian continent. Dutch navigators were the first Europeans known to have explored and mapped the Australian coastline. The first documented encounter was that of Dutch navigator Willem Janszoon, in 1606. Dutch seafarers also visited the west and north coasts of the continent, as did French explorers.

The most famous expedition was that of Royal Navy Lieutenant (later Captain) James Cook 164 years after Janszoon's sighting. After an assignment to make observations of the 1769 Transit of Venus, Cook followed Admiralty instructions to explore the south Pacific for the reported Terra Australis and on 19 April 1770 sighted the south-eastern coast of Australia and became the first recorded European to explore the eastern coastline. Explorers by land and sea continued to survey the continent for some years after settlement.

Pro-Iberian hypotheses and theories

Some writers have advanced the theory that the Portuguese were the first Europeans to sight Australia in the 1520s.

A number of relics and remains have been interpreted as evidence that the Portuguese reached Australia. The primary evidence advanced to support this theory is the representation of the continent of Jave la Grande, which appears on a series of French world maps, the Dieppe maps, and that may, in part, be based on Portuguese charts. However, most historians do not accept this theory, and the interpretation of the Dieppe maps is highly contentious. In the early 20th century, Lawrence Hargrave argued that Spain had established a colony in Botany Bay in the 16th century. Five coins from the Kilwa Sultanate were found on Marchinbar Island, in the Wessel Islands in 1945 by RAAF radar operator Morry Isenberg. In 2018 another coin, also thought to be from Kilwa, was found on a beach on Elcho Island, another of the Wessel Islands, by archaeologist and member of the Past Masters, Mike Hermes. Hermes speculated that the coins may suggest trade between indigenous Australians and Kilwa, or may have arrived via Makassan contact with Australia. Mike Owen, another member of the Past Masters group speculated that these coins may have arrived sometime after they had installed Muhammad Arcone on the Kilwa throne as a Portuguese vassal, from 1505 to 1506, or that the Portuguese had visited Wessel islands.

The French navigator Binot Paulmier de Gonneville claimed to have landed at a land he described as "east of the Cape of Good Hope" in 1504, after being blown off course. For some time it had been thought he landed in Australia, but the place he landed has now been shown to be Brazil (which is north-west of the Cape).

17th century

Dutch exploration

The most significant exploration of Australia in the 17th century was by the Dutch. The Dutch East India Company ("VOC", "United East India Company") was set up in 1602 and traded extensively with the islands which now form parts of Indonesia, and hence were very close to Australia already.

The first documented and undisputed European sighting of and landing on Australia was in late February 1606, by the Dutch navigator Willem Janszoon aboard the Duyfken. Janszoon charted the Australian coast and met with Aboriginal people. Janszoon followed the coast of New Guinea, missed Torres Strait, and explored and then charted part of the western side of Cape York, in the Gulf of Carpentaria, believing the land was still part of New Guinea. On 26 February 1606, Janszoon and his party made landfall near the modern town of Weipa and the Pennefather River, but were promptly attacked by the Indigenous people. He stopped in some places, but was met by hostile natives and some of his men were killed. At the final place, he initially had friendly relations with the natives, but after he forced them to hunt for him and appropriated some of their women, violence broke out and there were many deaths on both sides. These events were recorded in Aboriginal oral history that has come down to the present day. Here Janszoon decided to turn back, the place later being called Cape Keerweer, Dutch for "turnabout".

That same year, a Spanish expedition sailing in nearby waters and led by Pedro Fernández de Quiros landed in the New Hebrides and, believing such to be the fabled southern continent, named the land "Austrialia del Espiritu Santo" (Southern Land of the Holy Spirit), in honour of his queen Margaret of Austria, the wife of Philip III of Spain. Later that year, De Quiros' deputy Luís Vaez de Torres sailed to the north of Australia through Torres Strait, charting New Guinea's southern coast, and possibly sighting Cape York in October 1606.

In 1611 Hendrik Brouwer, working for VOC, discovered that sailing from Europe to Batavia was much quicker if the Roaring Forties were used. Up to that point, the Dutch had followed a route copied from Arab and Portuguese sailors who followed the coasts of Africa, Mauritius and Ceylon. The Brouwer Route involved sailing south from the Cape of Good Hope (which is at 34° latitude south) into the Roaring Forties (at 40–50° latitude south), then sailing east before turning north to Java using the South Indian Ocean Current. The Brouwer Route became compulsory for Dutch vessels in 1617. The problem with the route, however, was that there was no easy way at the time to determine longitude, making Dutch landfalls on the west coast of Australia inevitable, as well as ships becoming wrecked on the shoals. Most of these landfalls were unplanned. The first such landfall was in 1616, when Dirk Hartog, employed by VOC, reached land at Shark Bay (on what is now called Dirk Hartog Island) off the coast of Western Australia. Finding nothing of interest, Hartog continued sailing northwards along this coastline of Western Australia previously unknown to Europeans, making nautical charts up to about 22° latitude south. He then left the coast and continued on to Batavia. He called Australia shortened to Eendrachtslandafter his ship, a name which would be in use until Abel Tasman named the land New Holland in 1644.

In 1619 Frederik de Houtman, in the VOC ship Dordrecht, and Jacob d'Edel, in another VOC ship Amsterdam, sighted land on the Australian coast near present-day Perth which they called d'Edelsland. After sailing northwards along the coast they made landfall in Eendrachtsland, which had previous been encountered and named by Hartog, before turning for Batavia.

Hessel Gerritsz was appointed on 16 October 1617 as the first exclusive cartographer of VOC, whose job included creating and maintaining charts of coastlines in the area. Gerritsz produced a map in 1622 which showed the first part of Australia to be charted, that by Janszoon in 1606. It was considered to be part of New Guinea and called Nueva Guinea on the map, but Gerritsz also added an inscription saying: 
"Those who sailed with the yacht of Pedro Fernandes de Queirós in the neighbourhood of New Guinea to 10 degrees westward through many islands and shoals and over 2, 3 and 4 fathoms for as many as 40 days, presumed that New Guinea did not extend beyond 10 degrees to the south. If this be so, then the land from 9 to 14 degrees would be a separate land, different from the other New Guinea".

All charts and logs from returning VOC merchants and explorer sailors had to be submitted to Gerritsz and provided new information for several breakthrough maps which came from his hands. Gerritsz’ charts would accompany all VOC captains on their voyages. In 1627 Gerritsz made a map, the Caert van't Landt van d'Eendracht, entirely devoted to the discoveries of the West Australian coastline, which was named "Eendrachtsland", though the name had been used since 1619.

On 1 May 1622, Englishman John Brooke in the Tryall, a British East India Company owned vessel of approximately 500 tons, on the way to Batavia made the second English voyage to use Brouwer's southern route. He sailed too far east and sighted the coastline of Western Australia at Point Cloates (about 22° latitude south), although he mistook it for an island sighted in 1618 by Janszoon (and in 1816 named Barrow Island by Phillip Parker King). They did not land there, and a few weeks later were shipwrecked on an uncharted reef northwest of the Montebello Islands (about 20° latitude south, now known as Tryal Rocks). The shipwreck caused the deaths of 93 men, but Brooke, his son John and nine men scrambled into a skiff and the ship's factor Thomas Bright and 35 others managed to save a longboat. Brooke sailed separately to Java. Bright and his crew spent seven days ashore on the Montebello Islands, before sailing the longboat to Bantam in Java. This was the first recorded shipwreck in Australian waters and first extended stay in Australia by Europeans.

In 1623, Jan Carstensz was commissioned by VOC to lead an expedition to the southern coast of New Guinea and beyond, to follow up the reports of further land sighted by Janszoon in his 1606 voyages to the south. Setting off from Amboyna in the Dutch East Indies with two ships, the Pera and Arnhem (captained by Willem Joosten Van Colster), he traveled along the south coast of New Guinea, then headed south to Cape York Peninsula and the Gulf of Carpentaria. On 14 April 1623, he passed Cape Keerweer. Landing in search of fresh water for his stores, Carstensz encountered a party of the local indigenous Australian inhabitants, who he described as "poor and miserable looking people" who had "no knowledge of precious metals or spices". On 8 May 1623, Carstensz and his crew fought a skirmish with 200 Aborigines at the mouth of a small river near Cape Duyfken (named after Janszoon's vessel which had earlier visited the region) and landed at the Pennefather River. Carstensz named the small river Carpentier River, and the Gulf of Carpentaria in honour of Pieter de Carpentier, Governor-General of the Dutch East Indies. Carstensz reached the Staaten River before heading north again. The Pera and Carstensz returned to Amboyna while the Arnhem crossed the Gulf of Carpentaria, sighting the east coast of Arnhem Land.

In 1627, François Thijssen ended up too far south and on 26 January 1627 he came upon the coast of Australia, near Cape Leeuwin, the most south-west tip of the mainland. He called the land  ("The Land of Pieter Nuyts"). Part of Thijssen's map shows the islands St Francis and St Peter, now known collectively with their respective groups as the Nuyts Archipelago. Thijssen's observations were included as early as 1628 by Gerritsz in a chart of the Indies and Eendrachtsland

One Dutch captain of this period who was not really an explorer but who nevertheless bears mentioning was Francisco Pelsaert, captain of the Batavia, which was wrecked off the coast of Western Australia in 1629.

In August 1642, VOC despatched Abel Tasman and Franchoijs Visscher on a voyage of which one of the objects was to obtain knowledge of "all the totally unknown provinces of the kingdom of Beach". This expedition used two small ships, the Heemskerck and the Zeehaen. Starting in Mauritius both ships left on 8 October using the Roaring Forties to sail east as fast as possible. On 7 November, because of snow and hail the ships' course was altered to a more north-eastern direction. On 24 November 1642 Abel Tasman sighted the west coast of Tasmania, north of Macquarie Harbour. He named his discovery Van Diemen's Land after Antonio van Diemen, Governor-General of the Dutch East Indies. Proceeding south he skirted the southern end of Tasmania and turned north-east, Tasman then tried to work his two ships into Adventure Bay on the east coast of South Bruny Island where he was blown out to sea by a storm, this area he named Storm Bay. Two days later Tasman anchored to the north of Cape Frederick Hendrick just north of the Forestier Peninsula. Tasman then landed in Blackman Bay – in the larger Marion Bay. The next day, an attempt was made to land in North Bay; however, because the sea was too rough the carpenter swam through the surf and planted the Dutch flag in North Bay. Tasman then claimed formal possession of the land on 3 December 1642.

In 1644 Tasman made a second voyage with three ships (and the tender ). He followed the south coast of New Guinea eastwards, missed the Torres Strait between New Guinea and Australia, and continued his voyage westwards along the north Australian coast. He mapped the north coast of Australia making observations on the land, which he called New Holland, and its people. From the point of view of the Dutch East India Company, Tasman's explorations were a disappointment: he had found neither a promising area for trade nor a useful new shipping route.

By the end of the Renaissance (1450 to 1650), every continent had been visited and mostly mapped by Europeans, except the south polar continent now known as Antarctica, but originally called Terra Australis, or 'Australia' for short. This geographical achievement was displayed on the large world map Nova Totius Terrarum Orbis Tabula made by the Dutch cartographer Joan Blaeu in 1648 to commemorate the Peace of Westphalia.

Based on Joan Blaeu's  ("A New and Most Accurate Chart of the Sphere of the Earth") of the same year, it incorporated Tasman's discoveries. Although the original mosaic was worn flat, it was reproduced in 1748. This reproduction was left in storage for centuries before being restored after World War II as part of the Royal Palace of Amsterdam. It was also used as the basis of another mosaic in Canberra, focused specifically on the Australian section of the map of the eastern hemisphere.

Joan Blaeu's 1659 map shows the clearly recognizable outline of Australia based on the many Dutch explorations of the first half of the 17th century.

In 1664, the French geographer Melchisédech Thévenot published his  ("Relations of Various Interesting Voyages"), including a map of New Holland. He divided the continent on a line at longitude 135° east, which appears to have been on his initiative, as there was no such division in Tasman's journals or on his, Blaeu's, or Amsterdam Burgerzaal's maps or on any other Dutch maps of this period. This 135° E. line seems to have represented Thévenot's understanding of the Zaragoza Meridian or Tordesillas antimeridian, dividing the Portuguese East Indies conquered by the Dutch Empire in a protracted conflict across the 17th century from the lands reserved under those treaties for the Spanish Empire and reclaimed by the act of possession of "Austrialia" carried out by Pedro Fernández de Quirós in 1606. This western limit of Spain's claim is shown on the 1761 map of the Spanish Empire by Vicente de Memije,  ("Symbolic Presentation of the Spanish World") and played a part in the British claim and division of the territory during the establishment of New South Wales in the late 18th century and Western Australia in the early 19th century.

In 1696, Willem de Vlamingh commanded the rescue mission to Australia's west coast to look for survivors of the Ridderschap van Holland that had gone missing two years earlier. The mission proved fruitless, but along the way Vlamingh charted parts of the continent's western coast and as a result improved navigation on the Indian Ocean route from the Cape of Good Hope to the Dutch East Indies.

Others

Englishman William Dampier came looking for the Tryall in 1688, 66 years after it was wrecked. Dampier was the first Englishman to set foot on the Australian mainland on 5 January 1688, when his ship the Cygnet was marooned in King Sound. While the ship was being careened he made notes on the fauna and flora and the indigenous peoples he found there. He made another voyage to the region in 1699, before returning to England. He described some of the flora and fauna of Australia, and was the first European to report Australia's peculiar large hopping animals. Dampier contributed to knowledge of Australia's coastline through his two-volume publication A Voyage to New Holland (1703, 1709). His book of adventures, A New Voyage around the World, created a sensation when it was published in English in 1697. Though he was briefly marooned on the northwest Australian coast on the trip described in this book, only his second voyage seems to be of importance to Australian exploration.

18th century

In 1756, French King Louis XV sent Louis Antoine de Bougainville to look for the Southern lands. After a stay in South America and the Falklands, Bougainville reached Tahiti in April 1768, where his boat was surrounded by hundreds of canoes filled with beautiful women. "I ask you", he wrote, "given such a spectacle, how could one keep at work 400 Frenchmen?" He claimed Tahiti for the French and sailed westward, past southern Samoa and the New Hebrides, then on sighting Espiritu Santo turned west still looking for the Southern Continent. On June 4 he almost ran into heavy breakers and had to change course to the north and east. He had almost found the Great Barrier Reef. He sailed through what is now known as the Solomon Islands that, due to the hostility of the people there, he avoided, until his passage was blocked by a mighty reef. With his men weak from scurvy and disease and no way through he sailed for Batavia in the Dutch East Indies where he received news of Wallis and Carteret who had preceded Bougainville. When he returned to France in 1769, he was the first Frenchman to circumnavigate the globe and the first European known to have seen the Great Barrier Reef. Though he did not reach the mainland of Australia, he did eliminate a considerable area where the Southern land was not.

In the meantime, in 1768, British Lieutenant James Cook was sent from England on an expedition to the Pacific Ocean to observe the transit of Venus from Tahiti, sailing westwards in  via Cape Horn and arriving there in 1769. On the return voyage he continued his explorations of the South Pacific, in search of the postulated continent of Terra Australis. He first reached New Zealand, and then sailed further westwards to sight the south-eastern corner of the Australian continent on 20 April 1770. In doing so, he was to be the first documented European expedition to reach the eastern coastline of Australia. He continued sailing northwards along the east coast, charting and naming many features along the way. He identified Botany Bay as a good harbour and one potentially suitable for a settlement, and where he made his first landfall on 29 April. Continuing up the coastline, the Endeavour was to later run aground on shoals of the Great Barrier Reef (near the present-day site of Cooktown), where she had to be laid up for repairs. The voyage then recommenced, eventually reaching the Torres Strait. At Possession Island Cook formally claimed possession of the entire east coast he had just explored for Britain. The expedition returned to England via the Indian Ocean and Cape of Good Hope.

In 1772, two French expeditions set out to find Terra Australis. The first was led by Marc-Joseph Marion Dufresne who found and named the Crozet Islands. He spent a few days in Van Diemen's Land (now Tasmania) where he made contact with the island's indigenous people (the first European to have done so). In Blackmans Bay he claimed Van Diemen's Land for France. He then sailed on to New Zealand where he and some crewmen were killed by Māori warriors. The survivors retreated to Mauritius. Also in 1772, the two ships of the second French expedition were separated by a storm. The leader turned back but the second in command, Louis Aleno de St Aloüarn, sighted Cape Leeuwin and followed the Western Australian coast north to Shark Bay. He landed on Dirk Hartog Island and claimed Western Australia in the name of French King Louis XV.

Tobias Furneaux on  accompanied James Cook (in ) on Cook's second voyage (1772–1775), which was commissioned by the British government with advice from the Royal Society, to circumnavigate the globe as far south as possible to finally determine whether there was any great southern landmass, or Terra Australis. On this expedition Furneaux was twice separated from his leader. On the first occasion, in 1773, Furneaux explored a great part of the south and east coasts of Van Diemen's Land, and made the earliest British chart of the same. Most of his names here have survived. On Cook's third voyage (1776–80), in 1777 Cook confirmed Furneaux's account and delineation of it, with certain minor criticisms and emendations, and named after him the Furneaux Group at the eastern entrance to Bass Strait, and the group now known as the Low Archipelago.

Cook's first expedition carried botanist Joseph Banks, for whom a great many Australian geographical features and the plant genus Banksia and a number of plant species, e.g. Grevillea banksii, were named. The reports of Cook and Banks in conjunction with the loss of England's penal colonies in America after they gained independence and growing concern over French activity in the Pacific, encouraged the foundation by the British of a colony at Botany Bay. The First Fleet led by Captain Arthur Phillip left England on 13 May 1787 to found a penal colony in Australia. It reached Botany Bay in mid-January 1788. Phillip had decided to move the settlement to Sydney Cove in Port Jackson, but the British ships were unable to leave Botany Bay until 26 January because of a tremendous gale.

Just as he was attempting to move the colony, on 24 January 1788 Jean-François de Galaup, comte de Lapérouse arrived off Botany Bay. The French expedition consisted of two ships led by La Pérouse, the Astrolabe and the Boussole, which were on the latest leg of a three-year voyage that had taken them from Brest, around Cape Horn, up the coast from Chile to California, north-west to Kamchatka, south-east to Easter Island, north-west to Macao, and on to the Philippines, the Friendly Isles, Hawaii and Norfolk Island. The gale also prevented La Pérouse's ships from entering Botany Bay. Though amicably received, the French expedition was a troublesome matter for the British, as it showed the interest of France in the new land. To preempt a French claim to Norfolk Island, Phillip ordered Lieutenant Philip Gidley King to lead a party of 15 convicts and seven free men to take control of Norfolk Island. They arrived on 6 March 1788, while La Pérouse was still in Sydney.

The British received him courteously, and each captain, through their officers, offered the other any assistance and needed supplies. La Pérouse was 6 weeks in Port Jackson, where the French established an observatory, held Catholic masses, performed geological observations, and planted the first garden. Before leaving Sydney on 10 March, La Pérouse took the opportunity to send his journals, some charts and also some letters back to Europe with a British naval ship from the First Fleet—the Alexander. Neither La Pérouse, nor any of his men, were seen again. Fortunately the documents that he dispatched with the Alexander from the in-progress expedition were returned to Paris, where they were published.

In September 1791, the French Assembly decided to send an expedition in search of La Pérouse, and Bruni d'Entrecasteaux was selected to command the expedition. In 1792, d'Entrecasteaux landed and named Esperance in Western Australia and made many more discoveries and named many other places. The expedition suffered many difficulties, with d'Entrecasteaux dying on 21 July 1793 of scurvy. On 18 February 1794 the expedition vessels were surrendered to the Dutch authorities in the East Indies so that the new French Republican Government could not profit by them. Élisabeth Rossel, the most senior surviving officer, sailed from Java in January 1795 on board a Dutch ship taking with him the expedition's papers. The ship left Rossel at Table Bay but took the papers, but was captured by the British. After the Peace of Amiens in 1802, all the expedition papers were returned to Rossel, who was thus able to publish a narrative of the whole enterprise. In 1808 Rossel published the detailed Voyage de d'Entrecasteaux, envoyé à la recherche de Lapérouse produced by Charles-François Beautemps-Beaupré. The atlas contains 39 charts, of which those of Van Diemen's Land were the most detailed, and which remained the source of the English charts for many years. His expedition also resulted in the publication of the first general flora of New Holland.

Later exploration from the sea

In 1796 (after settlement), British Matthew Flinders with George Bass took a small open boat, the Tom Thumb 1, and explored some of the coastline south of Sydney. He suspected from this voyage that Tasmania was an island, and in 1798 Bass and he led an expedition to circumnavigate it and hence prove his theory. The sea between mainland Australia and Tasmania was named Bass Strait. One of the two major islands in Bass Strait was later named Flinders Island by Philip Parker King. Flinders returned to England in 1801.

Meantime, in October 1800, Frenchman Nicolas Baudin was selected to lead what has become known as the Baudin expedition to map the coast of Australia/New Holland. He had two ships, Géographe and Naturaliste captained by Jacques Hamelin, and was accompanied by nine zoologists and botanists, including Jean Baptiste Leschenault de la Tour. He reached Australia in May 1801, being the first to explore and map a part of the southern coast of the continent. The scientific expedition was a great success, with more than 2500 new species described. The French also met Indigenous people and treated them with high respect. Many Western Australian places still have French names today from Baudin's expedition (Peron Peninsula, Depuch Island, Geographe Bay, Cape Naturaliste, Cape Levillain, Boullanger Island and Faure Island). The Australian plant genus Lechenaultia is named after Jean Baptiste Leschenault de la Tour and Guichenotia after Antoine Guichenot. In April 1802, the Le Naturaliste under Hamelin explored the area of Western Port, Victoria, and gave names to places, a number of which have survived. Ile des Français is now called French Island.

Flinders' work came to the attention of many of the scientists of the day, in particular the influential Sir Joseph Banks, to whom Flinders dedicated his Observations on the Coasts of Van Diemen's Land, on Bass's Strait, etc.. Banks used his influence with Earl Spencer to convince the Admiralty of the importance of an expedition to chart the coastline of New Holland.

Investigator set sail for New Holland on 18 July 1801. Attached to the expedition was the botanist Robert Brown, botanical artist Ferdinand Bauer, and landscape artist William Westall. Due to the scientific nature of the expedition, Flinders was issued with a French passport, despite England and France then being at war. Flinders first sailed along the south coast to Sydney, then completed the circumnavigation of Australia back to Sydney.

While each was charting Australia's coastline, Baudin and Flinders met by chance in April 1802 in Encounter Bay in what is now South Australia. Baudin stopped at the settlement of Sydney for supplies. He sent home the larger Naturaliste with all the specimens that had been collected by Baudin and his crew. He then headed for Tasmania and conducted further charting of Bass Strait before sailing west, following the west coast northward, and after another visit to Timor, undertook further exploration along the north coast of Australia. Plagued by contrary winds and ill health, it was decided on 7 July 1803 to return to France. The expedition stopped at Mauritius, where he died of tuberculosis on 16 September 1803. The expedition finally came back to France on 24 March 1804. According to researchers from the University of Adelaide, during this expedition Baudin prepared a report for Napoleon on ways to invade and capture the British colony at Sydney Cove.

The British suspected that the reason for Baudin's expedition was to try to establish a French colony on the coast of New Holland. In response, the Lady Nelson and the whaler Albion, both under direction of Lieutenant John Bowen, sailed from Port Jackson on 31 August 1803 to establish a settlement in Van Diemen's Land, and on 10 October 1803 a convoy of two ships  and Ocean led by Captain David Collins carrying 402 people entered Port Phillip and formed a settlement near Sorrento.

The vessel stopped in Mauritius, thinking that he would be safe because of the scientific nature of his voyages, though England and France were at war at the time. However, the governor of Mauritius kept Flinders in prison for six and a half years. As a consequence, the first published map of the full outline of Australia was the Freycinet Map of 1811, a product of Baudin's expedition. It preceded the publication of Flinders' map of Australia, Terra Australis or Australia, by three years. Flinders also published in 1814 his account of the voyage in A Voyage to Terra Australis, which was published just before his death at the age of 40.

See also
 Aboriginal Australians
 Age of Discovery
 Dieppe maps
 European land exploration of Australia
 Indigenous Australians
 Jave la Grande
 History of cartography
 History of geography
 History of Australia
 Terra Australis
 Terra incognita

References

External links 
Explorers page at Project Gutenburg Australia
Australian Discovery page at Project Gutenburg Australia
original documentation from 17th Century Dutch exploration at Project Gutenburg Australia

European exploration of Australia
Maritime history